The coal darter (Percina brevicauda) is a small species of freshwater ray-finned fish, a darter from the subfamily Etheostomatinae, part of the family Percidae, which also contains the perches, ruffes and pikeperches. It is  found in eastern Mobile Bay basin, Alabama. The species' stronghold is in the main channel of the Cahaba River, primarily above the Fall Line. It prefers gravel runs and riffles of small to medium-sized rivers. 

The greatest threats to the species are the effects of pollution and urbanization. There are serious water quality problems during low water periods in the upper portion of the Cahaba River. The upper Cahaba River receives approximately half of its flow from waste water treatment plants and encompasses about 2/3 of the known range. Additionally, continued urbanization is resulting in increased siltation. Impoundments have fragmented the range.

References

 

brevicauda
Fish described in 1994
Taxa named by Royal Dallas Suttkus
Taxa named by Henry L. Bart Jr.